The Huddersfield grooming gang was a group of men who were convicted of sexual offences against girls in Huddersfield, West Yorkshire, United Kingdom. It is the largest gang ever convicted for sex abuse in the United Kingdom. The offences took place between 2004 and 2011, and the men were charged following the Operation Tendersea inquiry by the police. The trials began in April 2017 and 20 men were convicted in 2018 in three separate trials. Since then, further men have been convicted in a series of trials, bringing the total number of men convicted to 41 by August 2021.

A report released in June 2019 indicated that 15 of the 22 females involved were known to children's services. Although there was "sufficient evidence" that two girls were being sexually exploited, one as early as 2007, no action was taken by the Kirklees Children's Services.

Trials
Twenty-seven men were accused of sexual offences including rape and trafficking against 18 girls aged between 11 and 17, with two further women accused of child neglect. Due to the large number of defendants, the court proceedings against them were conducted in three separate trials. Reporting restrictions on the trial were imposed in November 2017 under the 1981 Contempt of Court Act to avoid prejudice on subsequent trials.

However, the restrictions on reporting was criticised by the far right, who claimed that it was a cover-up as the defendants were Asian and Muslims, and that it amounted to "state censorship". Far right activist Tommy Robinson live-streamed video from outside the court on Facebook during the second of the trials, filmed some of the accused and talked about Muslims and "jihad rape gangs", which led to his arrest and prosecution for contempt of court.

Twenty men were convicted of rape and abuse against 15 girls in October 2018. The men were convicted of more than 120 offences against 15 girls, and jailed for a total of 221 years. Reporting restrictions on the trials were partially lifted in October 2018. Sixteen of the gang were sentenced in October 2018, the remaining four were sentenced in November 2018.  One of the convicted gang members, Faisal Nadeem, appealed against the sentence arguing that Robinson's live video had prejudiced the trial, but his permission to appeal was refused by a Court of Appeal judge.

Six separate trials had been held by February 2020, with 34 men convicted in total.  Another man was convicted in April 2020.

Perpetrators
A total of 29 people were arrested and charged by March 2017 under Operation Tendersea.  Most of the gang were Pakistani and were from the areas of Huddersfield, Sheffield, Bradford and Dewsbury. The ringleader of the gang, however, was Amere Singh Dhaliwal, a Sikh man. He is a married father of two children and known by the nickname "Prestos".

In total 15 girls were abused. The first allegations to be taken seriously were made in 2011 when a victim wrote a letter to a judge about the abuse although no formal complaint was lodged at the time. A formal complaint was made in 2013 by another victim. Twenty of the accused were first convicted on 19 October 2018 of 120 offences against the 15 girls. One of the gang members, Sajid Hussain, fled during the trial and was sentenced in his absence. Two more men were sentenced in June 2019. Mohammed Akram was previously convicted and had his sentenced increased whilst Usman Khalid was sentenced to five years. A further five men were jailed in November 2019. Three of the men were not named for legal reasons whilst Umar Zaman fled to Pakistan and was sentenced in his absence. Zaman was later arrested and jailed when he tried to return to the UK in 2022. Seven more men were convicted in February 2020. A man was convicted in April 2020 along with another previously unnamed man, Shaqeel Hussain, who was sentenced to a further 12 months. Three men were sentenced in July 2021 for rape and grooming offences dating back to the 1990's. Three more men were sentenced in August 2021 whilst another man was further sentenced.

Remarks by Sajid Javid
After the reporting restrictions were lifted, the Conservative Home Secretary Sajid Javid sent out a tweet stating: "These sick Asian paedophiles are finally facing justice. I want to commend the bravery of the victims. For too long, they were ignored. Not on my watch. There will be no no-go areas." His referencing of the ethnic heritage of the offenders was strongly condemned by senior Labour politicians Diane Abbott, Sadiq Khan and David Lammy, who alleged that he was seeking “to pin the blame on [...] one group” and pandering to the toxic racist agenda of the far right. In a later interview with Sky News, Javid accused his critics of being "oversensitive" and refused to apologize or withdraw his comment, saying: "When I made that comment I was stating the facts, and the sad truth is that if you look at recent high-profile convictions of gang-based child sexual exploitation there is a majority of people that come from Pakistani heritage backgrounds - that's plain for everyone to see." 

In December 2020, a report by the Home Office stated that a number of studies have indicated an over-representation of Asian and Black offenders in group-based CSE. Most of the same studies show that the majority of offenders are White. The Home Office report also stated the research on offender ethnicity is limited, and tends to rely on poor quality data. It is therefore difficult to draw conclusions about differences in ethnicity of offenders; it is likely that no one community or culture is uniquely predisposed to offending.

See also
List of sexual abuses perpetrated by groups

References

2004 crimes in the United Kingdom
2000s crimes in the United Kingdom
2000s in West Yorkshire
2010s crimes in the United Kingdom
2010s in West Yorkshire
2010s trials
British people convicted of child sexual abuse
Crime in West Yorkshire
Grooming gang
Rape in the 2000s
Rape in the 2010s
Rape in Yorkshire
Sex crime trials
Sex crimes in England
Sex gangs
Pakistani-British gangs
Trials in England
Incidents of violence against girls